Martinsville is an independent city in the Commonwealth of Virginia in the United States. As of the 2020 census, the population was 13,485. A community of both Southside and Southwest Virginia, it is the county seat of Henry County, although the two are separate jurisdictions. The Bureau of Economic Analysis combines the city of Martinsville with Henry County for statistical purposes.

Martinsville is the principal city of the Martinsville Micropolitan Statistical Area, with a population of 63,765 as of the 2020 census.

History 
Martinsville was founded by American Revolutionary War General, Native American agent and explorer Joseph Martin, born in Albemarle County.<ref>[https://books.google.com/books?id=z2VzSg9hfp0C&pg=PA611  Virginia: A Guide to the Old Dominion'(Sixth Printing, 1956). Virginia Writers' Project, Work Projects Administration. p. 611. New York: Oxford University Press]. Books.google.com. Retrieved on May 9, 2012.</ref> He developed his plantation Scuffle Hill on the banks of the Smith River near the present-day southern city limits. General Martin and revolutionary patriot Patrick Henry, who lived briefly in Henry County and for whom the county is named, were good friends.

20th century
DuPont in 1941 built a large manufacturing plant for producing textile nylon filament, a vital war material. During the Cold War, the city was identified as a target for strategic bombing by the Soviet Union. This nylon production jump-started the growth of the textiles industry in the area.

In 1947 the paperclip shaped oval Martinsville Speedway Opened. And NASCAR still races there today making it the shortest oval in NASCAR.  
And it's been here since the First NASCAR Cup season in 1949.

For several years Martinsville was known as the "Sweatshirt Capital of the World", and in the 1980s it boasted of having more millionaires per capita than any city in America.

Business leaders in the mid-20th century, like Whitney Shumate, worked to improve sub-standard housing in Martinsville. He helped clear out a portion of Martinsville called "Mill Town", which had sub-standard rental housing originally provided for 19th century employees of a now defunct cotton mill. New homes were constructed in the neighborhood, built with sound materials and with all city services for the first time. What had originally been considered a depressed civic area rapidly became a center of progress as middle class Black residents finally began to prosper. As an editorial in the local newspaper noted, "One of the projects which won him considerable attention and praise was the instigation of the redevelopment of what was once known as Martinsville Cotton Mill Village. He and associates purchased about 50 houses in North Martinsville, and using private capital rather than federal aid, rebuilt them into comfortably inhabitable homes, making it possible for many persons to purchase homes within their financial range."

In the early 1990s, changing global economic conditions and new trade treaties made Martinsville textiles and furniture manufacturing economically unsustainable. Many firms closed shop and laid off thousands of workers; the production moved offshore to other countries. The city is repositioning itself long-term as a center for technology development and manufacturing.

MZM, Inc. opened a facility in Martinsville as part of the Cunningham scandal.

Memorial Hospital of Martinsville (now combined with the hospital in Danville, Virginia to become Sovah Health.) serves the greater Martinsville and Henry County area. The earliest local hospital was the 50-bed Shackelford Hospital, founded by Dr. Jesse Martin Shackelford, who was later joined by surgeon son Dr. John Armstrong Shackelford, an early graduate of Johns Hopkins University School of Medicine. Founder of the Hospital Association of Virginia, Dr. Jesse Shackelford was an early advocate of comprehensive care for state citizens. Shackelford Hospital was sold in 1946, and Martinsville General Hospital subsequently opened with Dr. John Shackelford as its first chief surgeon. In 1970 Memorial Hospital of Martinsville opened its doors, replacing Martinsville General.

Liberty Fair Mall opened in 1989.

21st century
In 2008, then Illinois Democratic Senator and 44th President of the United States Barack Obama held a campaign stop in Martinsville.

In August 2021, Virginia Governor Ralph Northam pardoned all 7 African-American men of the Martinsville Seven.

Relationship with Henry County
Martinsville's relationship with Henry County is somewhat complex. Martinsville was fully included in Henry County's jurisdiction until it was declared a city by court order in 1928. As with all cities in Virginia, Martinsville's incorporation as a city made it independent from Henry County's jurisdiction. Although Martinsville technically remains the county seat of Henry County, nearby Collinsville serves as the de facto county seat, as it is where the county's primary administrative and judicial offices are located. However, the future of this jurisdictional arrangement became unclear when Martinsville's city council unanimously voted in favor of beginning the process of reverting from a city to a town (which would reincorporate it into the county's jurisdiction) on December 10, 2019, citing economic and demographic concerns. The time frame for this reversion remains unclear, as the city's petition to revert must first be approved by a three-judge panel in the state courts, after which begins a complex process of negotiation with the county over the division of responsibilities.

The Beaver Creek Plantation, John Waddey Carter House, Dry Bridge School, East Church Street-Starling Avenue Historic District, Fayette Street Historic District, Little Post Office, Martinsville Fish Dam, Martinsville Historic District, Martinsville Novelty Corporation Factory, and Scuffle Hill are listed on the National Register of Historic Places.

Geography

The north side of the city has the highest average elevation. The east side slopes gradually down to the Smith River on the south side. The west side is hilly.

Climate

Demographics

2020 census

Note: the US Census treats Hispanic/Latino as an ethnic category. This table excludes Latinos from the racial categories and assigns them to a separate category. Hispanics/Latinos can be of any race.

2010 Census
As of the census of 2010, there were 13,821 people, 6,498 households, and 4,022 families residing in the city. The racial makeup of the city was 48.38% White, 45.45% African American, 0.10% Native American, 0.47% Asian, 0.69% from other races, and 0.81% from two or more races. Hispanics or Latinos of any race were 5.70% of the population.

There were 6,498 households, out of which 26.3% had children under the age of 18 living with them, 39.0% were married couples living together, 19.1% had a female householder with no husband present, and 38.1% were non-families. 34.2% of all households were made up of individuals, and 15.4% had someone living alone who was 65 years of age or older. The average household size was 2.27 and the average family size was 2.89.

The age distribution was 22.6% under the age of 18, 7.0% from 18 to 24, 26.7% from 25 to 44, 23.2% from 45 to 64, and 20.6% who were 65 years of age or older. The median age was 41 years. For every 100 females, there were 82.4 males. For every 100 females age 18 and over, there were 78.4 males.

The median income for a household in the city was $27,441, and the median income for a family was $35,321. Males had a median income of $28,530 versus $21,367 for females. The per capita income for the city was $17,251. About 14.0% of families and 19.2% of the population were below the poverty line, including 25.6% of those under age 18 and 16.9% of those age 65 or over. As of August 2010, the city's unemployment rate stood at 20 percent.

Economy
The city's chief industry for many early years was the manufacture of plug chewing tobacco. The Henry County area became known as the "plug tobacco capital of the world". In the wake of the collapse of the plantation economy following the American Civil War, the local economy was reeling. Stepping into the breach were several thriving plug firms which sold their merchandise across the nation beginning in the nineteenth century.

Local families were heavily involved in these companies, bestowing their names on them and reaping sizeable profits until the early twentieth century, when the tobacco monopolies created by R.J. Reynolds and James Buchanan Duke bought out most firms. (In most cases, in bold anti-competitive moves, the two tobacco titans simply shut down their acquisitions overnight. These actions resulted in a U.S. government lawsuit against American Tobacco Company.) Among the earliest of these firms were D.H. Spencer & Sons and Spencer Bros. Other families soon joined in founding other early firms, including the Gravelys, the Comptons, the Ruckers, the Wittens, the Lesters and the Browns.

The city's main industry for a century was furniture construction, and today Virginia furniture makers still reside in the region.

On October 28, 2021, it was announced the Colorado-based apparel and footwear company VF Corporation will continue to expand in Martinsville creating 82 new jobs, while investing $10 million into the area.

Government
The City of Martinsville operates under a council-manager government. The city council has five members who serve four-year terms. Every two years, the council elects a mayor and vice-mayor from among its members. An appointed city manager controls daily operations and manages the city's activities.Current council members':
Kathy Lawson, mayor 
Aaron Rawls, vice mayor
Eric H. Monday, city attorney 
Tammy Pearson, council member
Danny Turner, council member
Chad Martin, council member
Leon Towarnicki, city manager

Politics

Transportation

 Interstate highways 
  (future)
 
 
 
 
 
 
 

 Public Transportation 
The Piedmont Area Regional Transit (PART) operates and serves the city of Martinsville. Routes include parts of both Martinsville and Henry county.

 Air 
Martinsville is served by two commercial airports. Roanoke–Blacksburg Regional Airport  in Roanoke, and Piedmont Triad International Airport  in Greensboro, North Carolina.

The Blue Ridge Airport is used for general aviation and is located  outside the city.

Education

The city is served by the Martinsville City Public Schools. There are five public schools in Martinsville:
 Martinsville High School, opened in 1968 and serves roughly 580 students in grades 9–12.
 Martinsville Middle School, originally built as a high school in 1939 and serves roughly 430 students in grades 6–8.
 Albert Harris Elementary School, opened as a high school in 1958 and now serves roughly 490 students in kindergarten through fifth grade. The school is named after Albert Harris, an African-American minister who was a key advocate for the education of local African-American children.
 Patrick Henry Elementary School, opened in 1950 and serves roughly 435 students in kindergarten through fifth grade. The school is named after founding father Patrick Henry.
 Clearview Early Childhood Center, opened as an elementary school in 1954 and now serves roughly 140 students in preschool as part of the Virginia Preschool Initiative.

The city is also home to the K-12 private school, Carlisle School. The school serves approximately 400 students, about 130 of them are high school students. The School was established in 1968

Colleges and universities in Martinsville include the New College Institute and Patrick & Henry Community College, where students can also take satellite courses through Old Dominion University.

Religion
Houses of Worship in Martinsville:
First Baptist Church
Broad Street Christian Church
Christ Episcopal Church
Christ's Church 
First Baptist Church of East Martinsville
Fayette Street Christian Church
First UMC Uptown Ministry Center
First Presbyterian Church
Refuge Temple Holiness Church 
Galilean House of Worship

Arts and culture

 Piedmont Arts Association: Established in 1961, this non-profit museum is a museum partner of the Virginia Museum of Fine Arts and is accredited by the American Alliance of Museums 
Virginia Museum of Natural History: Established in 1984, non-profit museum affiliated with the Smithsonian Institution

 Events & Festivals 
Henry County Fair: An annual Fair held every September at the Martinsville Speedway.
Martinsville Uptown Oktoberfest: An annual family friendly event held in Uptown Martinsville featuring music, crafts, beer gardens, food, and many children activities.

Attractions
Martinsville Speedway
Martinsville Mustangs
Smith Mountain Lake 
Smith River
Philpott Lake
Blue Ridge Parkway

Sports

Martinsville is home to the Martinsville Mustangs of the Coastal Plain League, a collegiate summer baseball league. The Mustangs play at Hooker Field in Martinsville. The Mustangs began play for the league's 2005 season.

The Martinsville area is also home to Martinsville Speedway, which opened in 1947. The NASCAR Cup Series and NASCAR Xfinity Series hosts two races there every year while the NASCAR Camping World Truck Series hosts one race there every year. The speedway also host the NASCAR Whelen All-American Series.

Notable people

 
 Buddy Arrington – former NASCAR driver
 Rabih Abdullah – National Football League player
 John Robert Brown – US House of Representatives
 Thomas G. Burch –  American farmer, tobacco manufacturer, and politician (US House of Representatives and US Senate)
 Greg Gaines – National Football League player 
 Tony Gravely – UFC Fighter
 Clinton Gregory - country singer and fiddle player
 Carl Hairston – National Football League player
 George Hairston plantation owner, former sheriff of Henry County, Brigadier General, War of 1812
 Robert Hairston plantation owner, former sheriff of Henry County, captain of militia, French and Indian War
 Jeremy O. Harris- Actor and playwright
 Patrick Henry – American patriot (resided at Leatherwood Plantation, Henry County, outside current city limits) 
Odell Hodge – played college basketball at Old Dominion University and former professional basketball player 
Randy Hundley – former Major League Baseball player & coach; former all-star and Gold Glove winner
Todd Hundley – former Major League Baseball player, 2x All-star
 Hodgetwins – stand-up comedians
 Magdalen Hsu-Li – American singer-songwriter, painter, speaker, poet, and activist
 George Hairston Jamerson, Brigadier general during World War I
 Kristen-Paige Madonia – Novelist and creative writing teacher
 General Joseph Martin – American Revolutionary War general, explorer, legislator, Indian agent
 Delvin Joyce – National Football League player
 Barry Michaels – American radio personality 
 J. C. Martin, former Major league baseball player for New York Mets, 1969 World Series champion
 Thon Maker - 10th pick in the 2016 NBA Draft, NBA player for Milwaukee Bucks
 Matur Maker - professional basketball player
 Shawn Moore – National Football League and Canadian Football League player 
Alison Parker, former journalist and news reporter for WDBJ
 Jesse Penn – National Football League player 
 Nancy Redd – Author and former Miss Virginia
 Jessamine Shumate – artist, painter
 Whitney Shumate - businessman, developer
Gregory Swanson-though born in Danville, Va. Practiced law in Martinsville until 1957
 General Dennis L. Via - former Commanding General of the United States Army Materiel Command (AMC)
 Sonny Wade – Canadian Football League player
 "Sweet Lou" Whitaker — Major League Baseball player for Detroit Tigers, 1978 AL Rookie of the Year, 1984 World Series champion
 Stafford G. Whittle – Judge, Virginia Supreme Court of Appeals
 Kennon C. Whittle – Judge, Virginia Supreme Court of Appeals
 Red Top Young –  Blues, rhythm and blues, country, rock & roll, and jazz musician

Media
Print
 Martinsville Bulletin'', Martinsville's daily newspaper serving the city of Martinsville and Henry County, Virginia and is owned by Berkshire Hathaway.

Television
Martinsville is served by television stations in the Roanoke/Lynchburg television market. In addition Martinsville also receive television stations in the Greensboro/Winston-Salem/High Point television market.
 WDBJ, CBS affiliate based in Roanoke
 WSLS, NBC affiliate based in Roanoke
 WSET, ABC affiliate based in Lynchburg
 WFXR, Fox affiliate based in Roanoke
 WWCW, Fox affiliate based in Lynchburg
 WZBJ, an Independent station, based in Roanoke, licensed in Danville
 WPXR, ION affiliate based in Roanoke

Radio stations
 WHEE 1370, broadcast station based in Martinsville
 WROV-FM 96.3, commercial FM radio station based in Martinsville

Gallery

See also
 National Register of Historic Places listings in Martinsville, Virginia
 Martinsville Seven
 List of cities and counties in Virginia

References

External links
 City of Martinsville
 Old Photos
 Movies of Local People: Martinsville, VA, 1938, from the H. Lee Waters Film Collection

 
Cities in Virginia
Micropolitan areas of Virginia
County seats in Virginia
Southwest Virginia
Majority-minority counties and independent cities in Virginia